Ballymagash is a satirical Irish television programme that aired on RTÉ One for one series in 1983.  Presented by Frank Hall and featuring many of the cast members from the earlier Hall's Pictorial Weekly, the show was set in the fictional town of Ballymagash and cast a satirical eye on some of the "local" stories and personalities.

References

1983 Irish television series debuts
1983 Irish television series endings
Irish comedy television shows
RTÉ original programming